The cuneiform U sign is found in both the 14th century BC Amarna letters and the Epic of Gilgamesh. It can be used for the alphabetic u, instead of the more common 2nd u, (ú). It has two other uses, commonly. It can be used for the number 10 (especially the Amarna letters from Tushratta of Mitanni, or Burna-Buriash II the king of Babylon), but its probable greater use is for the conjunction, u, with any of the conjunction meanings: and, but, else, etc.

Of the three u's, by graphemic analysis (Buccellati, 1979), the commonness is as follows:

Ù (cuneiform), conjunction only (but also rare, for alphabetic "u")
ú (cuneiform), alphabetic 'u'
u (cuneiform), alphabetic (minor), 10, conjunction (highest use)

Both Ù (cuneiform) and ú are in the top 25 most used signs, but E (cuneiform) and "u (cuneiform)" are not; other vowels (or combination) in the 25 are: a (cuneiform), i (cuneiform), and ia (cuneiform), (which has a secondary use as suffix, "-mine", or "my", thus in top 25 most used signs). Suffix "iYa" is used in the Middle East\Southwest Asia at present day to end placenames, or other names: "My Xxxxx".

Amarna letters uses
The use of u for numeral 10 has been explained above. It is used in the letters from Tushratta, speaking of the ancestral relations with former father kings: ...my father loved your father (the Pharaoh) 10 times more, and I have 10 times more love now. May our relations... be forever "inter-related". (Amarna letter EA 19, 2nd paragraph, setting up the letter of a 13 paragraph letter, topics about daughter for Pharaoh's wife, love, gold, etc.)

Amarna letter EA 252, Labaya to Pharaoh, titled: Sparing One's Enemies, explains his actions in defending 'his position', after cities have been overtaken. He states in idiomatic iconography: "....my parts are eaten!..(.U.)And..I am slandered!. He continues in parable form: ".....if an ant is attacked (pinched), should it just sit (take it), or bite (the) hand back!?".... He continues to then discuss the men who have taken a city, (and a cult statue), and defends his past, and future actions.

Partial list of signs beginning with wedge (u)
Partial list of signs beginning with u, from the Epic of Gilgamesh (Parpola, 1971), and the Amarna letters:

 Cuneiform-u--Sign No. 1----(conjunction use, and "10"; occasionally for u)
 Cuneiform-AMAR, ṣur, zur--Sign No. 2---; Sumerogram: See!-(AMAR) (Akkadian, "amāru")-(Note: minus the vertical stroke)
 Cuneiform-di--Sign No. 3---
 Cuneiform-ki--Sign No. 4---
 Cuneiform-mi-(Sign 5)
 Cuneiform-ši, lim, or IGI ("in 'face' of", "before" Sumerogram)--Sign No. 6-----(Abdi-Ashirta), Abdi-A-Ši-iR-Ta, (wedge-sign, 4th sign)
 Cuneiform-u--Sign No. u-1---
 Cuneiform-ú--Sign No. u-2----(approximate: only 3 verticals for ú, (the common alphabetic u))
 Cuneiform-Ù-(u-3)--Sign No. 7---
 (With an added horizontal, ,after the left vertical)

Also:

 Cuneiform-ar, (Shuwardata of Amarna letter EA 282)
 Cuneiform-nim-(nem, nim, num, and Sumerograms NIM, NUM) (EA 34)

See also 
 Winkelhaken – one of the five basic wedge elements used in Akkadian cuneiform, identical to u.

References

Citations

Bibliography
Buccellati, Giorgio, (Ugarit-Forschungen 11, 1979). Comparative Graphemic Analysis of Old Babylonian and Western Akkadian, pp. 95–100.
Moran, William L. 1987, 1992. The Amarna Letters. Johns Hopkins University Press, 1987, 1992. 393 pages.(softcover)
 Parpola, 1971. The Standard Babylonian Epic of Gilgamesh, Parpola, Simo, Neo-Assyrian Text Corpus Project, c 1997, Tablet I through Tablet XII, Index of Names, Sign List, and Glossary-(pp. 119–145), 165 pages.
Ugarit Forschungen (Neukirchen-Vluyn). UF-11 (1979) honors Claude Schaeffer, with about 100 articles in 900 pages. pp 95, ff, "Comparative Graphemic Analysis of Old Babylonian and Western Akkadian", author Giorgio Buccellati, ( i.e. Ugarit and Amarna (letters), three others, Mari, OB,Royal, OB,non-Royal letters).

Cuneiform signs